
Gmina Smętowo Graniczne is a rural gmina (administrative district) in Starogard County, Pomeranian Voivodeship, in northern Poland.

Villages
Gmina Smętowo Graniczne contains the villages and settlements of Bobrowiec, Czerwińsk, Frąca, Grabowiec, Kamionka, Kopytkowo, Kornatka, Kościelna Jania, Kulmaga, Lalkowy, Leśna Jania, Luchowo, Rudawki, Rynkówka, Słuchacz, Smarzewo, Smętówko, Smętowo Graniczne, Stara Jania and Stary Bobrowiec.

Neighbouring gminas
Gmina Smętowo Graniczne is bordered by the gminas of Gniew, Morzeszczyn, Nowe, Osiek and Skórcz.

References
Polish official population figures 2006

Smetowo Graniczne
Starogard County